The Battle of Adramyttion occurred in autumn 1334 between the fleets of a Christian naval league, headed by the Republic of Venice and the Knights Hospitaller, and of the Turkish beylik of Karasi. The battle was a Christian victory.

Background
The Naval League participants agreed to assemble a fleet of 40 galleys, of which 10 vessels each were contributed by Venice and the Hospitallers, six each by the Byzantines and Cyprus, and another eight jointly by the Pope and the King of France. The fleet would gather at the Venetian stronghold of Negroponte, and operate for a period of five months. In the event, the Byzantines did not send any ships, so the League fleet that sailed in 1334 comprised 34 galleys. The Venetian fleet began operations in winter 1333/1334, fighting the combined fleets of the Turkish beys Umur of Aydin and Suleyman of Sarukhan off the Morea, as well as the forces of a Slav pirate, Zassis.

Battle
The Franco-Papal squadron joined up with the other squadrons in summer 1334, and the joint fleet proceeded to raid the western coasts of Asia Minor, belonging to the beyliks of Aydin, Karasi, and Sarukhan. In autumn, the League fleet was confronted by the fleet of the Karasid bey Yakhshi. In a series of engagements, the Crusaders inflicted a major defeat on the Karasids. The details and exact chronology are disputed—according to a badly damaged letter by Marino Sanudo Torsello, fights took place on 8, 11, 14, and 17 September, when Yakhshi's son-in-law was killed—but according to Western reports, 150–200 ships were destroyed and 5,000 Turks were killed.

Aftermath
The Christian fleet proceeded to raid the coasts of Asia Minor, and launched an attack on Smyrna, the main naval base of the Aydinid beylik. In the event, the Christian victory at Adramyttion was not followed up and proved fruitless; once the allied fleet departed from the Aegean, the Turkish raids resumed. King Hugh IV of Cyprus scored two further victories, about which no details are known, in 1336–37, but plans for a landing in Asia Minor in 1336 in preparation for a full Crusade had to be shelved due to the renewed conflict between England and France, since King Philip VI of France diverted the crusading fleet to the English Channel. It was not until 1342 that a new league was formed, and the Smyrniote Crusade launched.

See also
 Battle of Chios (1319)

References

Sources

Further reading
 

Conflicts in 1334
Adramyttion
Adramyttion
Adramyttion
Adramyttion
Adramyttion
Adramyttion
1334 in Asia